Battle of Savo may refer to:

 Battle of Savo Island (9 August 1942), between the Imperial Japanese Navy and Allied naval forces
 Second Battle of Savo Island or Battle of Cape Esperance (11–12 October 1942)
 Third Battle of Savo Island or Naval Battle of Guadalcanal (12–15 November 1942)
 Fourth Battle of Savo Island (disambiguation)